Michael Dov Weissmandl  (25 October 190329 November 1957) was an Orthodox rabbi of the Oberlander Jews of present-day western Slovakia. Along with Gisi Fleischmann he was the leader of the Bratislava Working Group which attempted to save European Jews from deportation to Nazi death camps during the Holocaust and was the first person to urge Allied powers to bomb  the railways leading to concentration camp gas chambers. Managing to escape from a sealed cattle car headed for Auschwitz in 1944, he later emigrated to America where he established a yeshiva and self-sustaining agricultural community in New York known as the Yeshiva Farm Settlement. Accusing the Zionist Jewish Agency of having frustrated his rescue efforts during the Holocaust, he became a staunch opponent of Zionism after the war. Weissmandl claimed to have discovered codes in the Biblical text.

Early life
Michael Ber was born in Debrecen, Hungary on 25 October 1903 (4 Cheshvan 5664 on the Hebrew calendar) to Yosef Weissmandl, a shochet. A few years later his family moved to Tyrnau (now Trnava, Slovakia). In 1931 he moved to Nitra to study under Rabbi Shmuel Dovid Ungar, whose daughter, Bracha Rachel, he married in 1937. He was thus an oberlander (from the central highlands of Europe), a non-Hasidic Jew.

Weissmandl was a scholar and an expert at deciphering ancient manuscripts. In order to carry out his research of these manuscripts, he traveled to the Bodleian Library in Oxford, England. It is related that he was treated with great respect by the Chief Librarian of the Bodleian after an episode when he correctly identified the author of a manuscript that had been misattributed by the library's scholars.

World War II and the Holocaust
While at Oxford University, Weissmandl volunteered on 1 September 1939 to return to Slovakia as an agent of World Agudath Israel. When the Nazis gathered sixty rabbis from Burgenland and sent them to Czechoslovakia, Czechoslovakia refused them entry and Austria would not take them back. Rabbi Weissmandl flew to England, where he was received by the Archbishop of Canterbury and the Foreign Office. Explaining the tragic situation, he succeeded in obtaining entry visas to England for the sixty rabbis.

The Working Group
 
When the Nazis, aided by members of the puppet Slovak government, began their moves against the Slovak Jews in 1942, members of the Slovak Judenrat formed an underground organization called the Bratislava Working Group. It was led by Gisi Fleischmann and Rabbi Weissmandl. The group's main activity was to help Jews as much as possible, in part through payment of bribes and ransom to German and Slovak officials. In 1942, the Working Group initiated high-level ransom negotiations with the Germans (ref. Fuchs and Kranzler books). The transportation of Slovak Jews was in fact halted for two years after they arranged a $50,000 (in 1952 dollars) ransom deal with the Nazi SS official Dieter Wisliceny.

Largely with the help of diplomats, Weissmandl was able to smuggle letters or telegrams to people he hoped would help save the Jews of Europe, alerting them to the progressive Nazi destruction of European Jewry. He managed to send letters to Winston Churchill and Franklin D. Roosevelt, and he entrusted a diplomat to deliver a letter to the Vatican for Pope Pius XII. He originated the proposal via Rabbi Solomon Schonfeld in London to bomb the rails leading to Auschwitz, but this, along with subsequent suggestions from others, was ultimately not implemented.

He and his Working Group helped distribute the Auschwitz Protocols. The recipients didn't do anything meaningful with the report except Moshe Krausz in Budapest who forwarded it to George Mantello in Switzerland via Romanian diplomat Florian Manilou.  Mantello publicized its content immediately upon receipt. This triggered large-scale grass roots demonstrations in Switzerland, sermons in Swiss churches about the tragic plight of Jews and a Swiss press campaign of about 400 headlines protesting the atrocities against Jews.

The events in Switzerland and possibly other considerations led to threats of retribution against Hungary's Regent Miklós Horthy by President Roosevelt, Winston Churchill and others. This was one of the main factors which convinced Horthy to stop the Hungarian death camp transports.

Deportation
In October 1944, Weissmandl and his family were rounded up and put on a train headed for Auschwitz. Weissmandl escaped from the sealed train by opening a hole with a saw he had secreted in a loaf of bread. He jumped from the moving train and made his way to Bratislava. There he found shelter in a bunker in a storage room of a private house, along with 17 other Jews who included the Rebbe of Stropkov Menachem Mendel Halberstam.

Rezső Kasztner visited the bunker several times, once, to the consternation of the inhabitants, in the company of SS officer Max Grüson. In April 1945, Kasztner visited again, this time in the company of another SS officer who took the party to Switzerland in a truck with an escort of German soldiers. On arriving in Switzerland, Weissmandl suffered a major heart attack.

Post-war America

Personal recovery
After the war, Weissmandl arrived in the United States having lost his family and having been unable to save Slovak Jewry. At first, he was so distraught that he would pound the walls and cry bitterly on what had befallen his people. Later he remarried and had children, but he never forgot his family in Europe and suffered from depression his entire life because of the Holocaust.

His second marriage was to Leah Teitelbaum (1924/5–9 April 2009), a daughter of Rabbi Chaim Eliyahu Teitelbaum and a native of Beregszász, Hungary. With his second wife, Weissmandl had five children.

Establishment of an American yeshiva
See: Yeshiva of Nitra
In November 1946, Weissmandl and his brother-in-law, Rabbi Sholom Moshe Ungar, re-established the Nitra Yeshiva in Somerville, New Jersey, gathering surviving students from the original Nitra Yeshiva. With the help of Rabbi Shraga Feivel Mendlowitz, Rabbi Weissmandl bought the Brewster estate in Mount Kisco, in Westchester County, New York and moved his Yeshiva there in 1949. There he established a self-sustaining agricultural community known as the "Yeshiva Farm Settlement". At first, this settlement was not welcome by its neighbors, but in a town hall meeting, Helen Bruce Baldwin (1907–1994) of nearby Chappaqua, wife of New York Times military correspondent and Pulitzer Prize winner, Hanson W. Baldwin, impressed by Rabbi Weissmandl, defended its establishment and wrote a letter-to-the-editor to the New York Times regarding it. Weissmandl designed the community's yeshiva to conform with Talmudic accounts of agricultural settlements, where a man would study Torah continuously until an age suitable for marriage, whereupon he would farm during the day and study in the evenings. While this novel approach was not fully realized, the yeshiva flourished. Currently, the settlement is known as the Nitra community.
(See also Kashau (Hasidic dynasty)).

Later life
During his later years, Weissmandl suffered from chronic heart disease and was frequently hospitalized. He suffered a severe heart attack in the early winter of 1957 and was hospitalized for several weeks. Upon his release, he attended the yeshiva's fundraising banquet, and then was readmitted to the hospital. His health deteriorated and he died on Friday, 29 November 1957 (6 Kislev 5718) at the age of 54. His second wife never remarried.

Weissmandl is buried in the Beth Israel Cemetery - also known as Woodbridge Memorial Gardens - in Woodbridge New Jersey, in the Khal Adas Yereim Vien section. On 1 September 2021, his son Rabbi Shmuel Dovid Weissmandl died aged 69 in floodwaters in Elmsford, New York.

Religious work

Books
Two of Weissmandl's books were published posthumously.
 Toras Chemed (Mt. Kisco, 1958) is a book of religious writings that includes many commentaries and homilies, as well as hermeneutic material of a kabbalistic nature. Included in this book are the observations that led to what is called the Torah Codes.
 Min HaMeitzar (Jerusalem, 1960) is a book that describes Rabbi Weissmandl's war-time experiences. The title consists of the first two words of Psalm 118:5, meaning "from the depths of despair", literally "From the Straits".  This is the main publication in which Weissmandl's accusations against the Zionist organizations appear. According to Yehuda Bauer, the book reflects Weissmandl's ideological biases and was edited by Weissmandl's relatives after his death, limiting the historical reliability of the book. For example, it does not mention the last two transports from Slovakia in October 1942, which contradict Weissmandl's belief that the Working Group's bribes were responsible for the cessation of deportation.

In 1958, Rabbi Weissmandl republished the magnum opus of Rabbi Jonah Teomim-Frankel, Kikayon D'Yonah with his own footnotes and glosses. In the introduction to this volume, Rabbi Weissmandl gives an emotional history lesson.

Notes

References

Some documentaries, recorded talks and songs

 VERAfilm (Prague), Among Blind Fools (documentary video)
 David Kranzler z"l - Four Jewish Rescuers 
 Dr David Kranzler - Talk after showing of AMONG BLIND FOOLS about Bratislava Working Group 
 The Rescuers by David Ben Reuven (song)

Sources
 Fuchs, Dr. Abraham (1984). The Unheeded Cry (also in Hebrew as Karati V'ein Oneh). Mesorah Publications.
 Hecht, Ben. Perfidy (also in Hebrew as Kachas)
 Kranzler, Dr. David. Thy Brother's Blood
  On Rabbi Michael-Ber Weissmandl, Recha Sternbuch and George Mantello
 Kranzler, Dr. David. Holocaust Hero: Solomon Shoenfeld - The Untold Story of an Extraordinary British Rabbi who Rescued 4000 during the Holocaust
 Fatran, Gila. The "Working Group", Holocaust and Genocide Studies, 8:2 (1994:Fall) 164–201; also see correspondence in issue 9:2 (1995:Fall) 269-276
 Satinover, Jeffrey (1997). Cracking the Bible Code. William Morrow.

External links
 The Working Group, The Story of the Jewish Community in Bratislava, Yad Vashem. Retrieved 22 December 2013
 The Holocaust Rescue efforts of Rabbi Chaim Michael Dov Weissmandl
 "Torah vs. the Computer" (Rabbi Weissmandl's work on gematria)
 "A Cry from the Pages"
 Ten questions to the Zionists by Rabbi Michael Dov Weissmandl

1903 births
1957 deaths
People from Debrecen
20th-century American rabbis
Slovak Orthodox rabbis
Haredi rabbis in Europe
American Haredi rabbis
Rosh yeshivas
Holocaust survivors
Jewish resistance members during the Holocaust
Blood for goods
Bratislava Working Group members
Anti-Zionist Haredi rabbis
Czechoslovak emigrants to the United States
Burials in New Jersey
Czechoslovak rabbis